The Samsung E1120 is a mobile phone made by Samsung, released in 2009. It is designed for lower budget markets, and is a small, light, basic and simple phone.

Features
 Clock, Alarm, Calendar, Organizer
 Calculator, Converter
 T9 predictive text
 Hands-free operation, Vibration
 1 Game (Sudoku)
 Phone tracker
 SOS messages
 Torch light
 Stopwatch, Timer
 Profiles
 Wallpapers, Themes
 Power saving mode
 uTrack

External links
 http://uk.samsungmobile.com/mobile-phones/samsung-e1120

E1120
Mobile phones introduced in 2009